Zelma is a village in the Canadian province of Saskatchewan within the Rural Municipality of Morris No. 312 and Census Division No. 11. The village is located along Saskatchewan Highway 763.

History 
Zelma incorporated as a village on August 10, 1910.

The Zelma Church was built in 1909 with a load of lumber for $500 and volunteer labour. Initially a Presbyterian Church, it was reorganised in 1917 as the Zelma United Church.

Until 1912, students were required to attend school in the neighbouring communities of Stonemount or Golden Wheat due to reluctance of many of the farmers (who were bachelors) in the area to vote in favour of spending tax money on a school. In 1912 the school district was established, originally using the church for classes until a one-room school house was constructed in 1925. The school closed in 1969, with students bussed to Young.

During the early years following the establishment of Zelma, the village had a thriving business community with a general store, lumber yards, a hotel, bakery, flour mill, and grain elevators; most of these business had disappeared by the end of the 1940s.

Demographics 

See also 
 List of communities in Saskatchewan

References

Villages in Saskatchewan
Morris No. 312, Saskatchewan
Division No. 11, Saskatchewan